is a former international table tennis player from Japan.

He won a gold medal at the 1954 World Table Tennis Championships in the Swaythling Cup (men's team event) with Ichiro Ogimura, Kichiji Tamasu, and Yoshio Tomita.

See also
 List of table tennis players
 List of World Table Tennis Championships medalists

References

Japanese male table tennis players
World Table Tennis Championships medalists